The International Ornithological Committee (IOC) recognizes these 255 species of owl in order Strigiformes; they are distributed among 25 genera in two families. The 20 species of genera Tyto and Phodilus, the barn owls, are in family Tytonidae. The other 235 species are in family Strigidae, the "typical owls". Five species on the list are extinct; they are marked (X). For a partial list with additional information, see the article "List of Strigiformes by population".

This list is presented according to the IOC taxonomic sequence and can also be sorted alphabetically by common name and binomial.

References

'
Owls